David Lim may refer to:

 David Lim (mountaineer), Singaporean mountaineer and motivational speaker
 David Lim (swimmer) (born 1966), former Singapore national swimmer and current national coach
 David Lim (water polo) (born 1938), Singaporean Olympic water polo player
 David Lim Kim San (born 1933), Singaporean music educator, administrator and conductor
 David Lim (actor) (born 1983), American actor and model